Highway 211 is a highway in the Canadian province of Saskatchewan. It connects Highway 11 near Dundurn to the main access road for Blackstrap Provincial Park and Township Road 330.

Highway 211 is a narrow, paved two-lane road for its entire length and has a  speed limit.

Major Attractions
Around km 6, there is a large slope that Highway 211 runs down. Directly after this slope is the bridge over the Blackstrap Reservoir, at the end of which is Highway 211's eastern terminus.

Major intersections
From west to east:

Trivia
There are only two sign markers meant to be viewed while travelling the actual Highway 211 road - one meant for eastbound travellers just east of the intersection with Highway 11, and one meant for westbound travellers just west of the Blackstrap access road. Neither marker indicates the direction (eastbound and westbound, respectively) the travellers would be going.

References

211